Grant Island is an ice-covered island,  long and  wide, lying  east of the smaller Shepard Island off the coast of Marie Byrd Land, Antarctica. Like Shepard Island, Grant Island is surrounded by the Getz Ice Shelf on all but the north side. Grant Island was discovered and charted by personnel aboard  on February 4, 1962. Grant Island was named by the United States Advisory Committee on Antarctic Names (US-ACAN) for Commander E. G. Grant, Commanding Officer of USS Glacier at the time of discovery.

See also 
 Composite Antarctic Gazetteer
 List of Antarctic and sub-Antarctic islands
 List of Antarctic islands south of 60° S

References

External links 

Islands of Marie Byrd Land